Kurtzenhouse is a commune in the Bas-Rhin department in Grand Est in north-eastern France.

Until January 1955 the commune was known by its German language name of "Kurtzenhausen".

Geography
The village is positioned about ten kilometres (six miles) south of Haguenau:  the surrounding countryside is largely taken up with agriculture. Through the south-eastern side of the commune runs the departmental road RD 37, and beside that the rather indirect railway line that connects Haguenau with Strasbourg to the south.

See also
 Communes of the Bas-Rhin department

References

Communes of Bas-Rhin
Bas-Rhin communes articles needing translation from French Wikipedia